Petar Slišković (born 21 February 1991) is a Bosnian-born Croatian professional footballer who plays as a striker for Indian Super League club Chennaiyin.

Career
A product of FSV Frankfurt's youth academy, Slišković made his professional debut on 29 January 2011 for Mainz 05 against 1. FC Kaiserslautern. On 31 August 2011, Slišković was loaned to second division side St. Pauli., and a year later he joined Dynamo Dresden on a season-long loan. He returned to Mainz in January 2013, six months early.

In February 2015, he left Mainz for good and joined Swiss Super League side FC Aarau on a one-and-a-half-year deal until 2016.

He moved to MSV Duisburg for the 2019–20 season. A year later, he signed for Türkgücü München.

On 17 January 2022, Slišković signed a 1.5-year contract with SV Wehen Wiesbaden.

Chennaiyin
In July 2022, Slišković moved to Indian Super League club Chennaiyin on a one-year deal.

On 20 August, he made his debut against Army Red in the Durand Cup, which ended in a 2–2 draw. On 1 September, his scored his first two goals for the club against TRAU in the Durand Cup, which ended in a 4–1 win. On 11 September, he scored a header against Mumbai City in the quarter-finals of the Durand Cup, in a 5–3 loss.

Career statistics

Club

References

External links

1991 births
Living people
Footballers from Sarajevo
Croats of Bosnia and Herzegovina
Association football forwards
Croatian footballers
Croatia under-21 international footballers
1. FSV Mainz 05 players
1. FSV Mainz 05 II players
FC St. Pauli players
Dynamo Dresden players
FC Aarau players
Stuttgarter Kickers players
Hallescher FC players
FC Viktoria 1889 Berlin players
VfR Aalen players
MSV Duisburg players
Türkgücü München players
SV Wehen Wiesbaden players
Chennaiyin FC players
Bundesliga players
2. Bundesliga players
Swiss Super League players
Swiss Challenge League players
3. Liga players
Regionalliga players
Indian Super League players
Croatian expatriate footballers
Croatian expatriate sportspeople in Germany
Expatriate footballers in Germany
Croatian expatriate sportspeople in Switzerland
Expatriate footballers in Switzerland
Croatian expatriate sportspeople in India
Expatriate footballers in India